Purpleman, a.k.a. Peter Yellow (born as Anthony Jones; 4 January 1962 – 19 August 2020) was a Jamaican dancehall deejay. Being one of three albino deejays in the 1980s (Yellowman, Purpleman, and King Mellow Yellow), he was originally given the name Peter Yellow before using the name Yellowman, & even released an album under this name. The name Purpleman was given to him by Nicodemus after they had started referring to Winston Foster as 'king yellowman'

Biography
Purpleman deejayed with King Jammy's sound system, including performing at 'clashes' with other systems such as Youth Promotion, Arrows, Killamanjaro and Black Scorpio at the 'Shock of the Century' in 1985. Purpleman's first release was an album entitled Hot In 1982. He went on to record a series of albums shared with other deejays including Yellowman, Sister Nancy, and Papa Tollo. In 2014 he made a comeback with a new album entitled "Home once more".

Death
Purpleman died on 14 August 2020 at the Kingston Public Hospital due to heart-related ailments.

Albums 

Hot (1982), Black Music/Sonic Sounds (as Peter Yellow)
DJ Confrontation (1982), CF – with U Brown
The Yellow, The Purple & The Nancy (1982), Greensleeves – with Yellowman, Fathead and Sister Nancy
Purpleman Saves Papa Tollo in a Dancehall (1983), Vista Sounds – with Papa Tollo
Laserbeam (1983), Enterprise (with Sister Candy)
Confessions (1983), Vista Sounds – credited to Yellowman, probably for commercial purposes
Showdown Vol. 5 (1982), Hitbound – with Yellowman and Fathead
Purple Man No Mash Up The Dance Hall digital download (2019), (Produced by Slikk Rikk San Diego, Ca. Video Edited by Rodney Davis.)

7" Discos 
1980s 
D&G (198?)
Dem A Call Mi Name (with Saramouche) (198?)
1990s
DJs Program(199?)

12" Discos 
1970s
A Fe We Jah (*as Ranking Purple)
1980s
Water Pumpee (198?)
Rose Marie (198?)
Level Vibes (1983)
Keep on Working (with Cornell Campbell) (198?)
Get Me Mad (1980)
Water Pumping (1983)
1990s
Daddymix (1996)

References

External links 
 Purpleman on Reggaelicious.com
https://www.instagram.com/p/ByNv9MwHrym

Jamaican reggae musicians
Musicians from Kingston, Jamaica
2020 deaths
1962 births